Rah Band-e Sofla (also Romanized as Rāh Band-e Soflá and Rāband-e Soflá) is a village in Hemmatabad Rural District, in the Central District of Borujerd County, Lorestan Province, Iran. At the 2006 census, its population was 88, in 22 families.

References 

Towns and villages in Borujerd County